Peter Sceats is a British businessman and political activist. He founded the commodity price indices upon which all Atlantic basin coal trade is based and all European power stations are valued. The coal indices he founded currently benchmark around $500 billion in international trade. He founded the Grand Union Co. a Utilities Merchant & Business Cost Management company in 2016 and was until May 2020 Head of Risk Management for the world's largest energy company as measured by energy value KazAtomProm. He is now a commodity risk consultant, contributing comment on energy markets to news services and television. Peter is an expert witness in commodity matters and an insider dealing/money laundering investigator; his podcast "Coal My Part in its Downfall" concerning the founding and early days of the API coal index was published by Anchor.FM on the 24th anniversary of the world's first coal derivative trades. https://anchor.fm/peter-sceats. Peter is chairman of his family's gin company "El-Bart/Camberwell Distillery" founded by James Sceats in 1898.

Early life
Sceats was born in Woodford, then in the county of Essex, the son of publican parents from a wine & spirit merchanting family, he was educated at local primary and comprehensive schools. He had a severe stammer in childhood.

Politics 

Sceats was an active campaigner for Vote Leave in the EU referendum of 2016 and stood as an independent in his home ward of Brizes & Doddinghurst in the 2016 council election, coming second to the winning the Conservative candidate but beating the Labour, Liberal Democrat and Green Party candidates. In March 2021, he authored the Fairness in Publicly Funded Salaries petition, a concept to salary-cap all publicly funded agencies in the UK at the level of the Prime Minister.

Awards and recognition
Energy Risk Magazine's Pioneer of Risk Management 
Member of the All Party Parliamentary Water Group 
Associate of the Energy Managers Association 
GlobalCoal Risk Manager of the Year 
MSTA (Dist.) Society of Technical Analysts Diploma with Distinction 
NLP Practitioner (NLPP Regents University)

Personal life 

Peter studied at South Bank University, Regents University and the London Metropolitan School of Business. He has one son and two daughters and lives in Essex. He is a singer/songwriter and wrote the charity singles Boxing Day Lazy and Lillian's Theme for Haven House Children's Hospice and the Stairway to Heaven Memorial Trust, respectively.

References

External links
https://www.globalcapital.com/article/k666srj3nfss/mining-outfit-to-add-coal-traders
http://www.LondonPowerLight.com
https://event.utilityweek.co.uk/futureretail/speaker/peter-sceats/
https://www.reuters.com/article/energy-coal-pricing/illiquid-physical-coal-may-distort-swaps-market-traders-idUSL5E8N3FVY20121220
http://devtraditionenergy.com/who-we-are/leadership
http://www.tradition.com/media/41205/tfs-statement-on-api-june-1-2006.pdf
https://www.edie.net/blog/Brokers-set-to-make-waves-in-the-water-market/6098203
http://www.eastlondonlines.co.uk/2012/10/75571/
http://www.weeklytribune.co.uk/
http://www.magindex.org/
https://anchor.fm/peter-sceats
https://el-bart.com

21st-century British businesspeople
UK Independence Party politicians
Living people
Year of birth missing (living people)